Joseph Charles Martin (October 12, 1924 – March 9, 2009) was a Catholic priest, recovered alcoholic and renowned speaker/educator on the issues of alcoholism and drug addiction.

Background
Martin attended St. Thomas Aquinas elementary school from 1930 to 1938, then completed four years of secondary education at Loyola high school.  He then went on to Loyola College and graduated in 1944.
 
Martin entered St. Mary's Seminary in Baltimore, Maryland in 1944, where he studied philosophy and theology.  On May 22, 1948, at the age of 24, Joseph C. Martin was ordained as a priest for the Archdiocese of Baltimore.
 
Martin's first assignment was to St. Joseph's College, a preparatory seminary serving the Archdiocese of San Francisco.  In 1951, Martin completed the rigorous training required to become a Sulpician.  His next assignment was at the Sulpician Seminary St. Charles College in Catonsville, Maryland.

During this time, Martin began drinking excessively and his behaviour became more and more erratic.  Despite repeated warnings, he was unable to get his drinking under control.  Finally, the Archdiocese was forced to take action and sent Martin for intervention and treatment.

Treatment at Guest House

On June 15, 1958, Martin entered Guest House in Lake Orion, Michigan, a treatment facility for the clergy that was founded and operated by Austin Ripley, a syndicated columnist.

While drinking Austin Ripley came across a copy of the Saturday Evening Post, and he discovered an article featuring Alcoholics Anonymous. The article described how this young organization helped alcoholics achieve and maintain sobriety. It also talked about their “Big Book” which had been in print for some time. As a result of this article, Austin Ripley began his journey of recovery through Alcoholics Anonymous, devoting a good deal of the ensuing year in conversations with Bill W. and Dr. Bob, the founders of AA.

Martin met Austin Ripley on the first day of his stay at Guest House. He also was introduced to Dr. Walter Green, another recovering alcoholic. Dr. Green was the first to talk to Martin about the manner in which drugs and alcohol cause the emotions to over-rule the intellect.

Martin deeply admired Austin Ripley, and was so impressed with Dr. Green's lectures that he saved his notes from his conversations with them for over 14 years.  They became the basis of his famous “Chalk Talks,” a series of lectures that have been heard by hundreds of thousands of people around the world. Martin always credited both men for teaching him everything he knows about alcoholism.

Career after treatment
After Martin achieved sobriety and learned all he could from Austin Ripley and Dr. Green, he embarked on a campaign of spreading his message of experience and hope.  He attended and completed the Rutgers Summer School of Alcohol Studies during the summer of 1971.  He then worked as a lecturer and educator in the Division of Alcoholism Control for the State of Maryland and as a freelance consultant on alcoholism, a position he held from the fall of 1973 until his death.  In 1972, Martin first put his lecture Chalk Talk on Alcohol on film for the US Navy.  He and Mrs. Mae Abraham started Kelly Productions, Inc. to produce and distribute this and other lectures on various media.  "Chalk Talk" would eventually become his signature lecture and would be widely utilized in most branches of the US Federal Government (especially the armed services), business and industry presentations, hospitals, rehabilitation centers, and many state alcohol programs.  He has made many other films, tapes, CDs and DVDs on various aspects of the disease of addiction and recovery from it. He is the author of several publications including “No Laughing Matter,” published by Harper & Row in 1982.  In 1983 Martin and Mrs. Mae Abraham founded Father Martin’s Ashley, a non-profit center dedicated to the treatment of the chemically addicted, located in Havre de Grace, Maryland.
Martin also continued to work within the church and participated in the International Conference on Drugs and Alcohol sponsored by the Vatican in 1991.

Martin died of heart failure at his home in Havre de Grace, Maryland, on March 9, 2009.  His burial Mass took place at the Baltimore Basilica on Friday, March 13, 2009, at 10:00am.

Selected works

See also
 Disease theory of alcoholism
 E. Morton Jellinek

References

External links 
 Kelly Productions.com The Home of Father Martin's films, audio CDs and books
 Father Martin.com
 Father Martin's Ashley

1924 births
2009 deaths
People from Aberdeen, Maryland
People from Havre de Grace, Maryland
Catholics from Maryland
20th-century American Roman Catholic priests
St. Mary's Seminary and University alumni